Barton Power Station was a coal-fired power station on the Bridgewater Canal in Trafford Park, near Eccles, Lancashire, England.

History
The construction of the station began in 1920 and operation began in 1923. The station's original equipment consisted of three Metropolitan-Vickers 27.5 MW turbo-alternators, nine Babcock & Wilcox chain-grate stoked boilers, Mather & Platt auxiliary equipment and British Thomson-Houston switchgear. The station supplied electricity to an area of 3,100 square kilometers and was one of the most advanced power stations of the time. Coal was delivered to the station in barges, using the Bridgewater Canal. Steam condensing and cooling was by water abstracted from the canal.

The station was extended twice with Metropolitan-Vickers supplying a 40 MW generating set in 1928, followed by an additional 50 MW set in 1938. 

In 1972 it had one 39 MW operational set and one 51.5 MW set. Thee boilers delivered 770,000 lb/h (97 kg/s) of steam at 350 psi (24.1 bar) and 371/441 °C. In that year the station sent out 72.149 GWh, the load factor was 11.9 percent and the thermal efficiency was 17.86 per cent.

The station was closed on 18 March 1974 with a reduced generating capacity of 69 MW. At the time the station was co-firing oil. The station was then demolished in 1978 and 1979. The first chimney was demolished in June 1979. A B&Q store now stands on the site of the station.

See also

 Timeline of the UK electricity supply industry
 List of power stations in England
 List of pre-nationalisation UK electric power companies
 National Grid (UK)
 Stuart Street power station

References

External links
 "Reinforced-Concrete Chimney Towers at the Barton Power-Station." By ARNOLD ATHERTON BSc.

Coal-fired power stations in England
Power stations in North West England
Demolished buildings and structures in Greater Manchester
Eccles, Greater Manchester